Hannah Bilka (born March 24, 2001) is an American women's ice hockey player for Boston College and member of the United States women's national ice hockey team. She represented the United States at the 2022 IIHF Women's World Championship.

Playing career
Bilka began her collegiate career for Boston College during the 2019–20 season. During her freshman year, she recorded 14 goals and 23 assists in 34 games. She led the team in points with 37, and led all rookies in the country in total points per game (1.13), assists per game (0.71) and shots on goal per game (4.06) during the regular season and tied for first in shots on goal (126). her 30 points in Hockey East play marked the ninth-highest total by a first-year player in league history. Following an outstanding season, she was named to the Hockey East Second Team, a unanimous selection to the Hockey East All-Rookie Team, and the USCHO All-Rookie Team. She was also awarded the Hockey East Rookie of the Year and the Women's Hockey Commissioners Association National Rookie of the Year.

During the 2020–21 season in her sophomore year, she recorded seven goals and nine assists in 19 games, in a season that was cancelled due to the COVID-19 pandemic. She ranked third on the team in scoring with 16 points and was subsequently named to the Hockey East Third Team. During the 2021–22 season in her junior year, she recorded 16 goals and 17 assists in 34 games. She ranked second on the team in points with 33 and led the team with a career-best plus-18 rating. Following the season, she was named to the Hockey East First Team, and New England Hockey Writers Association All-Star.

On August 19, 2022, Bilka was named a captain of the Eagles for the 2022–23 season.

International play
Bilka represented the United States at the 2018 IIHF World Women's U18 Championship where she recorded one goal and two assists in five games and won a gold medal. She again represented the United States at the 2019 IIHF World Women's U18 Championship, where she recorded one goal and two assists in five games and won a silver medal.

On August 14, 2022, she was named to the roster for the United States at the 2022 IIHF Women's World Championship.

Career statistics

Regular season and playoffs

International

References

External links

2001 births
Living people
American women's ice hockey forwards
Boston College Eagles women's ice hockey players
Ice hockey people from Texas
People from Coppell, Texas